The 1947–48 Sheffield Shield season was the 46th season of the Sheffield Shield, the domestic first-class cricket competition of Australia. Western Australia won the championship on their debut season despite the fact that they only played four matches. The title was awarded to them based on their average.

Table

Statistics

Most runs
Phil Ridings 649

Most wickets
Geff Noblet 35

References

Further reading
 Max Bonnell and Andrew Sproul, Black Swan Summer: The Improbable Story of Western Australia's First Sheffield Shield (2022) 

Sheffield Shield
Sheffield Shield
Sheffield Shield seasons